Crematogaster desecta is a species of ant of the subfamily Myrmicinae which can be found in Sri Lanka.

References

External links
Animaldiversity.org
It is.org
Antweb.org

desecta
Hymenoptera of Asia
Insects described in 1911